The Shell Grotto is an ornate subterranean passageway shell grotto in Margate, Kent, England. It was discovered in 1835, but its age and purpose remain unknown. The grotto is a Grade I-listed building and open to the public.

Overview

The grotto is entirely underground. The arch leads to what is known as the Rotunda, a central circular column, meeting at the farther side at the Dome - a shaft rising to the surface, capped to allow some daylight into the structure. The plan of the sub-base of the Dome is triangular, equilateral, and with an arch in the centre of each side. The two arches in the sides are those leading from the Rotunda, whilst the arch in the base leads into the Serpentine Passage. This passage, with its curving walls and over-arching vaults, is rich in mosaics of varied design. At the end of the Serpentine Passage, a further arch leads into the Rectangular Chamber. Here the decoration takes on a more formal and geometric character, but still finely drawn and executed. The subjects are chiefly star and sun shapes. The focal point, the "altar", is the arcuate niche which faces the gothic style entrance arch.

The purpose of the structure is unknown and various hypotheses date its construction to any time in the past 3,000 years. Hypotheses include: it was an 18th or 19th-century rich man’s folly; it was a prehistoric astronomical calendar; it was a meeting place for sea witchcraft; and it is connected with the Knights Templar or Freemasonry. Since the 2007 discovery of a domed cave under the Palatine Hill in Rome with shells, mosaics and marble in similar patterns to those in the Rectangular Chamber in Margate, some credence has been given to the theory that the Shell Grotto could have been created by the Phoenicians in the second half of the first millennium BCE, when they were founding many colonies from their base in Carthage, however the gothic style of the arches would be a first for a pre 12th century arcade.

The most frequently used shells throughout the mosaic – mussels, cockles, whelks, limpets, scallops, and oysters – are largely local. They could have been found in sufficient numbers from four possible bays: Walpole Bay in Cliftonville; Pegwell Bay especially at Shellness Point, Cliffsend, near Richborough; Sandwich Bay, Sandwich; and Shellness on the Isle of Sheppey. The majority of the mosaic is formed from the flat winkle, which is used to create the background infill between the designs. However, this shell is found only rarely locally, so could have been collected from shores west of Southampton, where it is abundant.

Attached to the grotto is a modern museum and gift shop.

History
There are conflicting accounts of the grotto’s discovery, although most agree on a date of 1835. The earliest reference to the discovery appears in an article in a predecessor of the Kentish Mercury of 9 May 1838:

It has remained in private ownership ever since. 

In 1932, the then new owner took over the grotto, and soon afterwards substituted electric lighting for the gas lighting that, over the decades, had blackened the once-colourful shells. Cleaning trials show that in the majority of the grotto, the shells have lost their colour under the dirt and are white. The structure has also suffered the effects of water penetration, though was removed from the Heritage at Risk Register in 2012 after a five-year conservation programme, carried out in partnership with English Heritage. A scheme to sponsor replacement mosaic panels – The Roundel Project – was established in 2012.

The Friends of the Shell Grotto was formed in 2008 and is a not-for-profit trust established to promote, conserve, and preserve the grotto as a unique historical monument.

References

Bibliography
Nigel Barker, Allan Marshall Brodie, Nick Dermott, Lucy Jessop, and Gary Winter – Margate's Seaside Heritage (Informed Conservation series), English Heritage, 2007
Harold Bayley – The Lost Language of Symbolism, Ernest Benn Ltd, 1974
Howard Bridgewater – The Grotto, Rydal Press, Keighley, Yorkshire, 1948, and Kent Archaeological Society, 3rd ed., 1957
Dorothea Chaplin – Matter, Myth and Spirit, Rider & Co, 1935 (ISBN B0000D5LFU)
Harper Cory – The Goddess at Margate, Henry Burt & Son Ltd, Bedford, 1949
Lionel Fanthorpe and Patricia Fanthorpe – The World’s Most Mysterious Places, Hounslow Press, 1999
Ruby Haslam – The Shell Temple, Regency Press, 1974
Ruby Haslam – "The Shell Grotto at Margate", in Underground Mythology, ed. by Sylvia Beamon; Able Publishing, 2002
Ruby Haslam – Reality and Imagery: The Grottoes of Margate and Twickenham, Athena Press, 2009
Michael Howard – Earth Mysteries, Robert Hale, 1989
Hazelle Jackson – Shell Houses and Grottoes, Shire Publications, 2001
Barbara Jones – Follies and Grottoes, Constable, 1953 (ISBN B0000CINFP) and revised second edition, 1974.
Rod LeGear – Underground Thanet, Trust for Thanet Archaeology, 2012
Patricia Jane Marsh – The Enigma of the Margate Shell Grotto, An examination of the theories on its origins, Martyrs Field Publications, 2011, revised 2nd ed., 2015, and revised 3rd ed., 2020
C. A. Mitchell – The Grotto: A Study of One of the First Great Civilizations, Cooper the Printer Ltd, Margate, c. 1949
Nigel Pennick – The Subterranean Kingdom, Turnstone, 1981
Conan Shaw and Nellie I. Shaw – The Shell Temple of Margate: An Archaic Masterpiece, Cooper the Printer, Margate, 1954
Theo Vennemann – "The Shell Grottoes of Thanet and Rome: Carthaginian Sanctuaries?", in Interdisciplinary Journal for Germanic Linguistics and Semiotic Analysis vol. 22, no. 1 (Spring 2017): pp. 69-110, International and Area Studies, University of California, Berkeley

External links

Official site: Shell Grotto
The Friends of the Shell Grotto
Historic England: Shell Grotto - 1341537
Subterranea of Great Britain: Shell Grotto
Photos of the grotto on Flickr

Shell grottoes
Margate
Buildings and structures in Kent
Tourist attractions in Kent
Grade I listed buildings in Kent
Grade I listed monuments and memorials
Garden design history of England